Sultana Rehendhi Dhaain Kabaidhi Kilage was the Sultana regnant of the Maldives from 1383 to 1388. 

She was the daughter of Sultan Mohamed I of the Maldives and succeeded to the throne after his death. She was forced to abdicate in favor of her husband, who then became Sultan Abdullah II of the Maldives.

References

External links 
WOMEN IN POWER 1350-1400

14th-century sultans of the Maldives
14th-century women rulers